Toro River Protected Zone, is a protected area in Costa Rica, managed under the Central Conservation Area, it was created in 1994 by decree 22838-MIRENEM.

References 

Nature reserves in Costa Rica
Protected areas established in 1994